Microdrillia fastosa is a species of sea snail, a marine gastropod mollusk in the family Borsoniidae.

Description
The height of the shell attains 5 mm, its width 1.9 mm.

(Original description) The shell is small, rather solid, slender and has a fusiform shape. It contains 8½  whorls of which six form the protoconch. The colour of adult whorls is straw yellow, the protoconch cinnamon brown.

Sculpture : running below the suture the adult whorls have a spiral thread which ascends into the protoconch for two whorls. This is followed by a broad concave fasciole, margined in turn by a sharp projecting keel which determines an angle in the contour of the shell. Halfway between the major keel and the suture runs a smaller keel. On the body whorl there are about fourteen spirals, gradually diminishing anteriorly, below the major keel. The fasciole is ornamented by spaced, delicate, concave riblets. Fine arcuate growth lines appear in the interstices of the spiral keels. In the protoconch, the first wliorl and a half are small, rounded, and spirally striate.  The rest protrude medially, and are crossed by fine sharp radial riblets, which on the last whorl number twenty-two. Their interstices are latticed by spiral threads.

Distribution
This marine species is endemic to Australia and occurs off New South Wales.

References

 Hedley, C. 1907. The results of deep sea investigation in the Tasman Sea. Mollusca from eighty fathoms off Narrabeen. Records of the Australian Museum 6: 283-304 
 Hedley, C. 1922. A revision of the Australian Turridae. Records of the Australian Museum 13(6): 213–359, pls 42-56
 Powell A. W. B. (1966). The molluscan families Speightiidae and Turridae. An evaluation of the valid taxa both Recent and fossil, with lists of characteristic species. Bulletin of the Auckland Institute and Museum 5: 1-184
 Laseron, C. 1954. Revision of the New South Wales Turridae (Mollusca). Australian Zoological Handbook. Sydney : Royal Zoological Society of New South Wales 1-56, pls 1-12.

External links
  Bouchet P., Kantor Yu.I., Sysoev A. & Puillandre N. (2011) A new operational classification of the Conoidea. Journal of Molluscan Studies 77: 273-308
 

fastosa
Gastropods of Australia
Gastropods described in 1907
Endemic fauna of Australia
Fauna of New South Wales